Rui Manuel da Silva Correia (born 22 October 1967) is a Portuguese former professional footballer who played as a goalkeeper.

He appeared in 264 Primeira Liga matches over 15 seasons, mainly with Braga.

Club career
Correia was born in São João da Madeira. In a 21-year professional career he represented Sporting CP, Vitória de Setúbal, G.D. Chaves, S.C. Braga, FC Porto (winning two Primeira Liga championships and starting most of the games in 1997–98), S.C. Salgueiros, C.D. Feirense, A.D. Ovarense and G.D. Estoril Praia.

Correia retired at almost 40, after four seasons in the second division – and one in the third with Feirense– and subsequently joined S.C. Olhanense as its goalkeeping coach. In 2010, he signed with top-flight club Académica de Coimbra in the same capacity.

International career
Correia earned two caps for Portugal and participated at UEFA Euro 1996, being an unused squad member for the quarter-finalists.

References

External links

1967 births
Living people
People from São João da Madeira
Portuguese footballers
Association football goalkeepers
Primeira Liga players
Liga Portugal 2 players
Segunda Divisão players
A.D. Sanjoanense players
Sporting CP footballers
Vitória F.C. players
G.D. Chaves players
S.C. Braga players
FC Porto players
S.C. Salgueiros players
C.D. Feirense players
A.D. Ovarense players
G.D. Estoril Praia players
Portugal under-21 international footballers
Portugal international footballers
UEFA Euro 1996 players
Sportspeople from Aveiro District